John Crowther (26 August 1850 – 17 October 1894) was a New Zealand cricketer. He played in two first-class matches for Wellington from 1873 to 1882.

See also
 List of Wellington representative cricketers

References

External links
 

1850 births
1894 deaths
New Zealand cricketers
Wellington cricketers
Cricketers from Wellington City